(born December 27, 1974 in Niigata) is a retired male boxer from Japan. He represented his native country at the 1996 Summer Olympics in Atlanta, Georgia, where he was stopped in the first round of the men's light-welterweight division (– 63,5 kg) by Russia's Eduard Zakharov.

References

1974 births
Living people
Light-welterweight boxers
Boxers at the 1996 Summer Olympics
Olympic boxers of Japan
People from Niigata (city)
Sportspeople from Niigata Prefecture
Boxers at the 1994 Asian Games
Japanese male boxers
Asian Games competitors for Japan